Johannes Fabritius (30 November 1636 – after 1693) was a Dutch Golden Age painter.

Fabritius was born in Beemster as the son of Pieter Carelsz Fabritius. He was the brother of Barent and Carel Fabritius. Carel died in the Delft explosion of 1654.

Fabritius is known for still life paintings and probably died in Hoorn where he  went to live in 1676.

References

External links
 

1636 births
1690s deaths
Dutch Golden Age painters
Dutch male painters
People from Beemster